Nazarovsky (masculine), Nazarovskaya (feminine), or Nazarovskoye (neuter) may refer to:
Nazarovsky District, a district of Krasnoyarsk Krai, Russia
Nazarovsky (rural locality), a rural locality (a khutor) in Rostov Oblast, Russia